FCBA can refer to

 Future Carrier Borne Aircraft, see Joint Combat Aircraft
 Federal Circuit Bar Association
 Federal Communications Bar Association
 Fair Credit Billing Act (1974)
 sometimes: Federación Cubana de Béisbol